Endoscypha is a genus of fungi in the Helotiales order. The relationship of this taxon to other taxa within the order is unknown (incertae sedis), and it has not yet been placed with certainty into any family. This is a monotypic genus, containing the single species Endoscypha perforans. The genus and species were described as new to science in 1924 by German mycologist Hans Sydow.

References

External links

Helotiales
Monotypic Leotiomycetes genera